Rosa 'Wild Blue Yonder',  (aka WEKisosblip), is a grandiflora rose  cultivar, bred by Tom Carruth in 2004, and introduced into the United States by Weeks Rose Growers in 2006. The rose was named an All-America Rose Selections winner in 2006.

Description
'Wild Blue Yonder' is a medium upright bushy shrub, 4 to 5 ft (120—152 cm) in height with a 3 to 4 ft (90—121 cm) spread. Blooms are medium-large,  4—5 in (10—12 cm) in diameter, with a full, cupped, ruffled bloom form, and a petal count of 26 to 40. Flowers bloom in clusters. The flowers are purple-red, with shades of lavender and a silver reverse. The rose has a strong, citrus fragrance and semi-glossy, dark green foliage. 'Wild Blue Yonder' is very disease resistant. It blooms in flushes from spring through fall. The plants does well in USDA zone 5 to 9.

Child plants
Rosa 'Grande Dame', (2009)
Rosa 'Diamond Eyes', (2011)
Rosa 'Easy to Please', (2016)

Awards 
 All-America Rose Selections (AARS) winner, USA, (2006)

See also
Garden roses
Rose Hall of Fame
List of Award of Garden Merit roses

References

 

Wild Blue Yonder